Ynyshir Albions F.C. are a Welsh football team based in  the village Ynyshir in the Rhondda Valley. They currently have a senior side in the Cymru South, the second tier of the Welsh football pyramid.

History
The club was founded in 1992. They were promoted to the Welsh Football League from the South Wales Alliance Premier Division in 2019.

They joined the newly formed Ardal Leagues for the 2020–21 season although the season was cancelled due to the Coronavirus pandemic. The following season they finished second in the inaugural season of the Ardal Southwest. As league runners-up they played the runners-up of the Ardal Southeast in a playoff match for promotion to the tier 2 Cymru South, beating Abertillery Bluebirds 3–0.

Honours
Ardal Southern playoff final
Winners: 2021–22
Ardal SW League
Runners-up: 2021–22
South Wales Alliance League
Premier Division – Champions (1) : 2018–19
Premier Division – Runners-up (1) :  2017–18
Division One – Runners-up (1) : 2016–17
Division Two – Champions (1) :  2015–16 
 South Wales Senior League
Division One – Champions (1) : 2002–03 
Division One – Runners-up (3): 1999–2000; 2003–04; 2004–05  
Division Two – Champions (2): 1998–99; 2007–08
Division Two – Runners-up (2): 1998–99; 2011–12
Rhondda & District League
Champions: 1997–98
South Wales FA Senior Cup
Winners: 2003–04
Bruty Cup
Winners: 2001-02

History
A number of other teams have historically existed in Ynyshir; Wattstown A.F.C,  Ynyshir Rangers F.C, Ynyshir Albion F.C and Ynyshir United F.C.

References

External links
 Club official Twitter

Football clubs in Wales
Rhondda Valley
Welsh Football League clubs
South Wales Alliance League clubs
Association football clubs established in 1992
South Wales Senior League clubs
Ardal Leagues clubs
Cymru South clubs